The 1900 Alabama gubernatorial election took place on November 2, 1900, in order to elect the governor of Alabama. Incumbent Democrat Joseph F. Johnston decided not to run for a third term in office.

For the last time, the Governor of Alabama was elected to a two-year term. Afterwards, Alabama governors would be elected for terms of four years.

Results

References

1900
gubernatorial
Alabama
November 1900 events